Henrietta is a town in Monroe County, New York,  United States and a suburb of Rochester. The population of Henrietta is 47,096, according to the 2020 United States Census. Henrietta is home to the Rochester Institute of Technology and to one of the largest retail shopping districts in Monroe County.

History
The first residents of the Henrietta area were Native Americans.  Although no evidence of Native American villages has been found in Henrietta, numerous artifacts and skeletons have been unearthed by farmers and archeologists over the past 200 years.

With the end of the American Revolution, several resident Native American tribes that had sided with the British were forced to leave Upstate New York.  As a result, land became available for European settlers in the Finger Lakes and Genesee Valley regions.

The town of Henrietta was named after Henrietta Laura Pulteney, Countess of Bath in Great Britain. Her father Sir William Pulteney, 5th Baronet, was a major British investor from the Pulteney Association who owned the land that became the town. Henrietta Pulteney never visited the town named after her.  Pulteney eventually sold his holdings, which then passed through the hands of several American investors.

The first European settlers were Major Ezekiel Scott and his wife Catherine, who purchased 900 acres in 1790. Most of the original arriving settlers were English.
 
Two villages, East and West Henrietta, arose in the area, both part of the Town of Pittsford. In 1818, a dispute about the recording of deeds prompted residents of the two villages to secede from Pittsford and form the town of Henrietta.

With the opening of the Erie Canal in 1825, Henrietta farmers gained access to the New York City market for their crops and the town prospered.  In 1826, residents opened the Monroe Academy, the first incorporated school in Monroe County.

With the end of World War II and White Flight, the population of Henrietta went from 3,000 to approximately 14,000 in ten years as people started moving to the Rochester suburbs.  The building of the New York Thruway through Henrietta in the early 1950s made the town more desirable for commercial development. In 1968, the Rochester Institute of Technology moved from the city to a new campus in Henrietta.  That same year, the National Technical Institute for the Deaf opened in Henrietta.

In the 1980s, with the completion of Interstate 390 and the building of the Marketplace Mall, Henrietta developed into one of the major retail shopping destinations in Monroe County.

The Andrew Short House, Antoinette Louisa Brown Blackwell Childhood Home, and Tinker Cobblestone Farmstead are listed on the National Register of Historic Places in 1983.

Geography
The western town line of Henrietta is defined by the Genesee River. On the west side of the river are the towns of Chili and Wheatland. To the north of Henrietta is the town of Brighton, to the east are the towns of Pittsford and Mendon, New York, and to the south is the town of Rush. Henrietta is south of the City of Rochester, but does not share a border with the city.

Both the New York Thruway (Interstate 90) and Interstate 390 run through Henrietta.  A short section of the Erie Canal passes through the northeastern side of the town.

Government

Henrietta's town government consists of a town supervisor and four town board members. Town board meetings are scheduled on the first and third Wednesday of each month (except July and August when they are scheduled on the third Wednesday only). All town board meetings begin at 7:00 PM EST at the Henrietta Town Hall.

Other boards and commissions in Henrietta include the Zoning Board, Planning Board, Conservation Board, Youth Board, Recreation Commission, Historic Site Committee, Assessment Board, and Library Board.

Demographics

As of the census of 2000, there were 39,028 people, 12,823 households, and 8,501 families residing in the town.  The population density was 1,102.2 people per square mile (425.6/km2).  There were 13,243 housing units at an average density of 374.0 per square mile (144.4/km2).  The racial makeup of the town was 84.3% White, 6.9% African American, 0.27% Native American, 5.5% Asian, 0.03% Pacific Islander, 0.97% from other races, and 17.3% from two or more races. Hispanic or Latino of any race were 3.03% of the population.

There were 12,823 households, out of which 30.6% had children under the age of 18 living with them, 53.8% were married couples living together, 9.2% had a female householder with no husband present, and 33.7% were non-families. 22.7% of all households were made up of individuals, and 6.9% had someone living alone who was 65 years of age or older.  The average household size was 2.60 and the average family size was 3.09.

In the town, the population was spread out, with 20.4% under the age of 18, 23.9% from 18 to 24, 26.8% from 25 to 44, 19.6% from 45 to 64, and 9.3% who were 65 years of age or older.  The median age was 30 years. For every 100 females, there were 111.7 males.  For every 100 females age 18 and over, there were 113.3 males.

The median income for a household in the town was $51,081, and the median income for a family was $60,803. Males had a median income of $39,636 versus $30,271 for females. The per capita income for the town was $19,821.  About 3.2% of families and 9.1% of the population were below the poverty line, including 6.3% of those under age 18 and 3.3% of those age 65 or over.

As of the 2005-2009 American Community Survey, the racial makeup of the town was 81.5% White, 7.9% African American, 0.27% Native American, 5.9% Asian, and 3.1% Hispanic or Latino and 1.4% other.

Communities and locations in the Town of Henrietta
The East Henrietta hamlet is located at the crossroads of East Henrietta (New York State Route 15A) and Lehigh Station Roads (New York State Route 253). It was the site of the Monroe Academy, the first secondary school in the county, which later became Rush-Henrietta Senior High School. Also located at this intersection was the Kirby House, a nationally recognized example of Greek Revival architecture. It has since been relocated to a residential neighborhood near Stone Road in Henrietta.

The West Henrietta hamlet is located at the crossroads of West Henrietta (Route 15) and Erie Station Roads.  It is the site of the West Henrietta Baptist Church, built in 1838. The West Henrietta Post Office and the West Henrietta Fire Department building is next to the church.  The building in which the Post Office and Fire Department are located was an old school house that dates back to the 1920s.  The building has seen various renovations from school house to fire station. A pizza restaurant is located in a general store building that dates back to 1906. The Cartwright Inn building was built in 1831 and housed a restaurant for many decades and now is closed.

Riverton was established in 1973 by the federal government as a planned community.  The privately owned Riverton Golf Course is enjoyed by area golfers.

Education

Universities
Rochester Institute of Technology (RIT)

Schools
Bryant & Stratton College
Rush-Henrietta Central School District
School of the Holy Childhood - a non-profit agency for people with developmental disabilities.
The Norman Howard School - a day school for children with disabilities.
Continental School of Beauty
Aab Cardiovascular Research Institute (University of Rochester)

Notable people
Antoinette Brown Blackwell, first ordained female minister in the United States
Shenise Johnson, professional WNBA basketball player

References

External links

New York (state) populated places on the Genesee River
Rochester metropolitan area, New York
Towns in Monroe County, New York
1818 establishments in New York (state)
Populated places established in 1818